NPMA may refer to:

 16S rRNA (adenine1408-N1)-methyltransferase, an enzyme
 National Pest Management Association, a non-profit organization